Encyclia patens is a species of orchid. The diploid chromosome number of E. patens has been determined as 2n = 40.

Footnotes and External Links

patens